Paul Renaud (born 1975) is a French comic book artist and illustrator, and working for both European and French markets.

In 2004 Budd Root's Basement comics published Paul Renaud 's Cavewoman: The Movie comic book. Other American publishers Renaud has done work for include Image Comics (Fear Agent #8, Invincible), and Dynamite Entertainment (Red Sonja and Athena).

Renaud cover work for Dynamite include Warlord of Mars: Dejah Thoris, The Darkness Vs. Eva, Vampirella, Danger Girl and Army of Darkness, The Green Hornet: Parallel Lives.

His cover work for Marvel Comics includes "War of Kings", Timestorm 2009-2099, All-New Savage She-Hulk, Astonishing X-Men, Thunderbolts, Ms. Marvel.

In 2014, Renaud did the interior art and colors on Uncanny Avengers Annual #1 and Captain America #24. In 2015 came Secret Wars #0, S.H.I.E.L.D #6, and Sam Wilson: Captain America #4.

Renaud frequently does the coloring on his comics, or work with colorist Romulo Fajardo Jr.

Bibliography
Cavewoman (script and art, Amryl/Basement Comics)
 Jungle Jam #1 (August 2006)
 Jungle Jam #2 (late Fall 2006)
Fear Agent #8 (back-up story, Image Comics, September 2006. Reprinted in 2008 in Dark Horse Comics trade paperback Tales of the Fear Agent
Red Sonja #17 (cover art, regular edition, sketch edition variant, negative art edition variant) Dynamite Entertainment, October 2006)
Red Sonja #25 (cover art, regular edition, Dynamite Entertainment, 2007)
Sword of Red Sonja: Doom of the Gods #1-4 (cover art, regular editions, Dynamite Entertainment, 2007)
Red Sonja: Vacant Shell (cover art, regular edition, sketch edition variant, interior art, Dynamite Entertainment, 2007). The one-shot was later reprinted in the trade paperback Red Sonja: Travels volume one by Dynamite Entertainment.
Astonishing X-Men #31 French edition  (cover art Variant edition Panini Comics, December 2007)
The Darkness Vs Eva: Daughter of Dracula #1-4 (cover art, regular editions, Dynamite Entertainment, Top Cow, 2008)
Red Sonja #31 (cover art (regular edition) Dynamite Entertainment, 2008)
Red Sonja: Vacant Shell One-Shot Black and White edition (cover art Dynamite Entertainment, 2008)
Red Sonja #40 (cover art (regular edition) Dynamite Entertainment, 2008)
Hawkeye and Mockingbird (Marvel Comics 2011)
Avengers World #11 Cover (Marvel Comics 2014)
Uncanny Avengers Annual #1 variant cover, art and colors (Marvel 2014)
Uncanny Avengers #24 Cover (Marvel Comics 2014)
Uncanny Avengers #25 Cover (Marvel Comics 2014)
Captain America #24 10 pages interior (Marvel Comics 2014)
Uncanny Avengers (Reprint of Uncanny Avengers Annual #1) (Marvel Comics 2015)
S.H.I.E.L.D. #6 interior (Marvel 2015)
Avengers: No More Bullying Cover (Marvel Comics 2015)
Secret Wars #0 FCBD 2015 art and colors (Marvel Comics 2015)
Sam Wilson: Captain America #4
Best of Paul Renaud Artbook 64 page reprinting Paul Renaud's covers (Dark Dragon Books 2014)
Star Wars #1 (variant cover Fantastico) Cover (Marvel Comics 2014)
Star Wars #1 (variant cover Hot Topic) cover (Marvel Comics 2014)
Star Wars #1 (France) couverture n°14, cover collector done by Panini Comics

External links
Official website
Paul Renaud's Message Board

1975 births
Living people
French illustrators
French comics artists